N-Methylmethanimine or N‐methyl methylenimine is a reactive molecular substance containing a methyl group attached to an imine. It can be written as CH3N=CH2. On a timescale of minutes it self reacts to form a trimer, of trimethyl 1,3,5-triazinane. N-Methylmethanimine is formed naturally in the Earth's atmosphere, by oxidation of dimethylamine and trimethylamine, both of which are produced by animals, or burning.

Production
N-Methylmethanimine can be produced in two steps from dimethylamine, by first chlorinating the nitrogen atom with solid N-chlorosuccinimide, and then treating with potassium tert-butoxide at 90°C. Also it can be formed directly by thermal decomposition.

At , trimethylamine decomposes into methane and N-methylmethanimine.

Natural occurrence
N-Methylmethanimine should be formed in the atmosphere as a result of degradation by oxidation of di- and trimethylamine. These occur at concentrations of a few parts per billion. But N-methylmethanimine cannot be detected. This is likely because it forms the trimer, gets absorbed onto particles, such as cloud droplets, and hydrolyses to form methylamine and formaldehyde.

Properties
The N-Methylmethanimine molecule has Cs symmetry. The infrared spectrum and microwave spectrum have been observed.

The bond length for C=N is 1.279 Å, and for the N-C bond it is 1.458 Å. The ∠ C=N-C is 116.6°.

The electric dipole moment is 1.53 Debye.

When heated to 535°, N-methylmethanimine decomposes to hydrogen cyanide (HCN) and methane (CH4).

Between 400 and 550°C, the cyclic amine, aziridine decomposes to a mixture of N-methylmethanimine and ethylideneimine.

References

Imines